Red flag laws were laws in the United Kingdom and the United States enacted in the late 19th century, requiring drivers of early automobiles to take certain safety precautions, including waving a red flag in front of the vehicle as a warning.

Red flag law in the United Kingdom 

In the United Kingdom, the law required self-propelled vehicles to be led by a pedestrian waving a red flag or carrying a lantern to warn bystanders of the vehicle's approach.

In particular the Locomotives Act 1865, also known as Red Flag Act, stated:

The Red Flag Act was repealed in 1896, by which time the internal combustion engine was well into its infancy.

Red flag law in the United States 
In the United States, the state of Vermont passed a similar Red Flag Law in 1894, only to repeal it two years later. This law stated that "[t]he owner or person in charge of a carriage, vehicle or engine propelled by steam, except road rollers" must have a "person of mature age [...] at least one-eight of a mile in advance of" the vehicle, to warn those with livestock of its impending arrival. If at night, it also required the aforementioned person to carry a red light. The law did not apply to rail vehicles.

References

Bibliography 

 Bailey, T., and Kennedy, D. The American Pageant. Lexington: D. C. Heath, 1994. 
 Olyslager, P. and Sir J. Brabham. Illustrated Motor Cars of the World. New York: Grosset & Dunlap, 1967. 
 The Underground California Highway Patrol Handbook.

Traffic law
Law enforcement techniques